The 2022–23 season is the 127th season in the history of FC Zürich and their sixth consecutive season in the top flight. The club are participating in the Swiss Super League, the Swiss Cup, the UEFA Champions League and the UEFA Europa League.

Players

First-team squad

Out on loan

Transfers

Pre-season and friendlies

Competitions

Overall record

Swiss Super League

League table

Results summary

Results by round

Matches 
The league fixtures were announced on 17 June 2022.

Swiss Cup

UEFA Champions League

Second qualifying round 
The draw for the second qualifying round was held on 15 June 2022.

UEFA Europa League

Third qualifying round 
The draw for the third qualifying round was held on 18 July 2022.

Play-off round 
The draw for the play-off round was held on 2 August 2022.

Group stage 

The draw for the group stage was held on 26 August 2022.

Notes

References

FC Zürich seasons
Utrecht
2022–23 UEFA Champions League participants seasons
2022–23 UEFA Europa League participants seasons